Sheykh Hoseyn may refer to:
 Sheykh Hoseyn, East Azerbaijan
 Sheykh Hoseyn, Khuzestan
 Sheykh Hoseyn, Shush, Khuzestan Province
 Sheykh Hoseyn, Kohgiluyeh and Boyer-Ahmad